State Route 57 (SR 57) is a north–south state highway in northeast Ohio.

Route description

SR 57 begins at US 30 as a two-lane road near Orrville in Wayne County. The highway travels north through Orrville and east of Rittman, intersecting SR 585 between the two towns. Further north, SR 57 enters Medina County and runs along the western edge of Wadsworth and passes the Wadsworth Municipal Airport before intersecting I-76/US 224 (Exit 7). Now in a northwesterly direction, SR 57 enters Medina after traveling over I-71 without an interchange. In Medina, SR 57 has a short concurrency with SR 3 and a longer concurrency with SR 18, which travels through the town square and splits northwest of town, at the same location where a concurrency with SR 252 begins. This concurrency ends a mile north where SR 57 runs northwest, entering Lorain County and meeting up with SR 303 and SR 83, having concurrencies with both routes.

In Lorain County, SR 57 passes through the town of Grafton before intersecting the western terminus of SR 82 and then intersecting US 20/SR 10/SR 301 south of Elyria, which is a freeway at this location. This intersection is the western terminus of SR 10 as well as the beginning of SR 57's concurrency with US 20 and SR 301. This concurrency travels north as a four-lane divided highway around the east side of Elyria before US 20 turns off to the east but the SR 57/SR 301 concurrency continues and a concurrency with SR-113 begins at the next intersection SR-301 turns north, but SR-113 stays curving west around the north side of Elyria and traveling alongside I-80 (Ohio Turnpike) but not intersecting it, until SR 113 continues west and SR 57 turns north. Just past this intersection, SR 57 meets I-80 (Exit 145) at a double trumpet interchange and continues north, still as a four-lane divided highway, passing the Midway Mall and numerous businesses and hotels before intersecting I-90/SR 2 (Exit 145), less than a mile north of I-80. This is also I-90's first eastbound exit after splitting from its multi-state concurrency with I-80. SR 57 then runs north toward the east side of Lorain, where it ceases to be a divided highway but remains a four-lane road. Just south of a large steel plant, SR 57 turns west and then north, heading toward downtown Lorain, where it meets US 6 and ends, half a mile south of Lake Erie.

History
Prior to the construction of the SR 2/Ohio Turnpike connector around 1976, I-90 traffic had to use SR 57 to access the Turnpike. In 2003 the loop from SR 57 southbound to I-90/SR 2 eastbound in this interchange was removed and replaced by a left turn to simplify traffic movements on SR 57, and the opposite loop had been removed by 2004 to make it a six-ramp partial cloverleaf interchange.

Rebuilding and widening program
The improvement of the SR 57 corridor between the Ohio Turnpike and I-90 in Elyria is a long-awaited project to improve safety and reduce congestion in this heavily commercial area. This stretch of SR 57 contains a disorganized cluster of roads and exits and has been said to be a high-crash zone, according to city and Ohio Department of Transportation District 3 officials. This project will modify the existing SR 57 interchange with I-90 in Elyria as well as remove the existing 49th Street bridge over SR 57. SR 57 will be widened to six lanes between the Ohio Turnpike and I-90, and Midway Mall Boulevard will also be widened. The SR 57 and I-90 interchange will be converted to a full diamond interchange with signals.

Major junctions

References

057
Transportation in Wayne County, Ohio
Transportation in Medina County, Ohio
Transportation in Lorain County, Ohio